Mamamoo (stylized in all caps) is a South Korean girl group formed by RBW (formerly WA Entertainment) in 2014, composed of four members: Solar, Moonbyul, Wheein, and Hwasa. The group officially debuted with their single "Mr. Ambiguous" on June 18, 2014. Their debut was considered by some critics as one of the best K-pop debuts of 2014. They are recognized for their retro, jazz, R&B concepts and their strong vocal performances.

Name 
The group name "Mamamoo" is symbolic of the first time a baby babbles. In addition, it has the meaning of approaching instinctively and primitively like a baby.

History

2014–2015: Formation, debut and rising popularity 
Prior to their official debut, Mamamoo collaborated with several artists. Their first collaboration titled "Don't Be Happy" with Bumkey was released on January 8, 2014. A second collaboration with K.Will titled "Peppermint Chocolate" featuring Wheesung was released on February 11, 2014. "Peppermint Chocolate" debuted at number 11 on the Gaon Digital Chart in its first week. On May 30, 2014, Mamamoo released a collaboration single called "HeeHeeHaHeHo" with rap duo Geeks.

The group made their official debut on June 18, 2014, with lead single "Mr. Ambiguous" from their first extended play (EP) Hello. The music video for "Mr. Ambiguous" contained cameo appearances from many well-known K-pop industry figures such as CNBLUE's Jonghyun, Baek Ji-young, Wheesung, Jung Joon-young, Bumkey, K.Will, and Rhymer of Brand New Music. The album contained three previously released collaborations and four new songs. The group made their first live appearance on the June 19 episode of M Countdown. In July 2014, Mamamoo released their first original soundtrack contribution titled "Love Lane" for the Korean drama Marriage, Not Dating.

On November 21, 2014, Mamamoo released their second EP Piano Man with the title track of the same name. The title song peaked at 41 on Gaon's Digital chart. By the end of 2014, Mamamoo ranked tenth highest among idol girl groups for digital sales, 19th in album sales, and 11th in overall sales according to Gaon's year-end rankings. On January 10, 2015, Mamamoo performed a rendition of Joo Hyun-mi's "Wait a Minute" at the singing show Immortal Songs 2, reaching the final round before losing to Kim Kyung-ho.

On April 2, 2015, Mamamoo released "Ahh Oop!", the first single of their third EP titled Pink Funky. "Ahh Oop!" marks the group's second collaboration with label mate Esna, after she was featured in "Gentleman" on their second EP Piano Man. On June 13, 2015, the group traveled to Ulaanbaatar, Mongolia, to perform at an event sponsored by the South Korean Embassy with Crayon Pop and K-Much. The event was a commemorative concert held in honor of the 25th anniversary of diplomatic ties between South Korea and Mongolia.

On June 19, 2015, Mamamoo released their third EP Pink Funky and lead single "Um Oh Ah Yeh". The song was a commercial success, peaking at number three on the Gaon Chart, becoming their first top-three single. On August 23, 2015, after promotions concluded, Mamamoo held their first fan meeting, entitled "1st Moo Party", for a total of 1,200 fans at the Olympic Park in Seoul. Tickets for the fan meeting sold out within one minute, so the group added an additional meeting for 1,200 more fans the same night. They also held another "Moo Party" in Los Angeles, which took place on October 4, 2015. Mamamoo also collaborated and performed with label mate Basick on the Korean rap survival show Show Me the Money.

On August 29, 2015, Mamamoo returned to Immortal Song 2 with a rendition of Jo Young-nam's "Delilah". On October 31, 2015, Mamamoo returned to the Immortal Song 2, singing a rendition of Korean trot singer Bae Ho's song "Backwood's Mountain" (두메산골). Their performance earned their first overall win on Immortal Song with 404 points.

2016–2017: Breakthrough and subsequent EPs

On January 10, 2016, RBW announced Mamamoo's first solo concert since their debut in 2014. The concert, titled 2016 Mamamoo Concert-Moosical, was held on August 13–14, 2016, at the Olympic Hall in Seoul. 7,000 tickets for the concert were sold out in one minute.

On January 26, 2016, Mamamoo pre-released an R&B ballad, "I Miss You", from their first full-length album Melting. On February 12, 2016, another track, "1cm/Taller than You" was pre-released with a music video. The full album was released on February 26, 2016, debuting at number 3 on the Gaon Chart. The title track "You're the Best (넌 is 뭔들)" also debuted at number three but peaked at number one the following week, becoming their first number-one single.

On March 6, 2016, they received their first music show win with the song "You're the Best" on Inkigayo, followed by wins on Music Bank, M Countdown, and other music shows. They received eight wins in total for the single. On March 16, 2016, Mamamoo performed in Austin, Texas at South By Southwest's K-Pop Night Out.

On August 31, 2016, Mamamoo released the singles "Angel" and "Dab Dab" as subgroups consisting of vocalists (Solar and Whee In) and rappers (Moon Byul and Hwa Sa) respectively. On September 21, 2016, Mamamoo released their follow-up digital single "New York" and accompanying music video.  After wrapping up promotions for "New York" Mamamoo's agency announced that the group will make their comeback on November 7 with their fourth EP, Memory. The lead single for Memory was announced to be "Décalcomanie". Shortly afterwards, Mamamoo participated in several year-end award shows, while also featuring in the OST titled "Love" for hit TV show Goblin.

On January 19, 2017, Mamamoo announced their second solo concert titled 2017 Mamamoo Concert Moosical: Curtain Call, which was held on March 3–5, 2017 in Seoul and August 19–20, 2017 in Busan at KBS Busan Hall. Following the first show of their March 2017 concert in Seoul, Mamamoo received criticism for performing in blackface when, as part of the concert, they played a video containing the members impersonating Bruno Mars while wearing darker makeup, meant to recreate a snippet of the music video for Mars' "Uptown Funk" (2014). The clip was cut from following concert dates and multiple apologies were promptly issued, including one directly from the members, stating that they were "extremely ignorant of blackface and did not understand the implications of our actions. We will be taking time to understand more about our international fans to ensure this never happens again." The group released their fifth EP Purple with the lead single "Yes I Am" on June 22, 2017. The single quickly climbed to the number one spot on the Melon real-time chart. After one day, Mamamoo set the record for the highest number of unique listeners in 24-hours with "Yes I Am" on Melon for a girl group. On June 27, 2017, the song received its first music show win on The Show, followed by wins on Show Champion, M Countdown, and Show! Music Core. Purple also peaked at number one on the Billboard World Albums chart.

2018–2020: Widespread recognition, Japanese debut and member solo debuts
On January 4, 2018, Mamamoo released a pre-release single called "Paint Me" to act as a prelude to their upcoming project series "Four Seasons, Four Colors". The goal of the series is to showcase four mini albums, each combining one color and a matching member's characteristic for each season. The group has stated that they wish to show their depth as artists and present a more mature style with this project.

Mamamoo started off the "Four Seasons, Four Colors" project with the release of their sixth EP, Yellow Flower, on March 7. Yellow Flower debuted at number one on the Gaon Album Chart, becoming their first number-one album since their 2014 debut. The Latin-inspired and dance-pop song "Starry Night" was released alongside the album, with an accompanying music video. "Starry Night" debuted and peaked at number two on the Gaon Digital Chart, earning 44.7 million Gaon Index points in its debut week. It also ranked at number six on the mid-year and 13 on the year-end editions of the Gaon Digital Chart, making it the fourth-highest-charting song by a girl group on the latter. The song earned the group their first music recording certification since the Gaon Music Chart and Korea Music & Content Association (KMCA) introduced certifications in April 2018; in November 2018, it was certified platinum for 100 million streams, and July 2019, it was certified platinum for 2.5 million paid digital downloads.

On July 1, Mamamoo released the single "Rainy Season" as the pre-release single from their upcoming album. "Rainy Season" peaked at number two on the Gaon Digital Chart, behind only Blackpink's "Ddu-Du Ddu-Du", and was nominated for Best Female Vocal Performance at the 2018 Genie Music Awards. The group released their seventh EP, Red Moon, which serves as the second installment in the "Four Seasons, Four Colors" series, on July 16. The EP debuted and peaked at number three on the Gaon Album Chart, with 38,000 copies sold in July 2018. The EP debuted at number four on the Billboard World Albums with 1,000 copies cold, marking their best U.S. sales week, and gave the group their first-ever appearance on the Billboard Heatseekers Albums Chart, entering the chart at number 25. The Latin-pop lead single "Egotistic", released alongside the EP, peaked at number four on the Gaon Digital Chart and the Billboard World Digital Songs Sales chart, earning the group their fifth top-ten entry on the latter chart.

On August 18–19, Mamamoo held their third headlining concert, titled "2018 Mamamoo Concert 4Seasons S/S", at the SK Olympic Handball Gymnasium in Seoul. Tickets for the concert were sold out within two minutes of being available for sale.

Mamamoo released their debut Japanese single, the re-recorded Japanese version of their 2016 single "Décalcomanie", on October 3 by Victor Entertainment. The CD and digital releases of the single also include the b-side "You Don't Know Me", a pop track that serves as their first original Japanese song. "Décalcomanie" peaked at number 11 on the weekly Oricon Singles Chart, with over 9,000 copies sold. On November 29, the group returned to the Korean-language market, releasing their eighth EP Blue;S, which serves as the third installment of the "Four Seasons, Four Colors" series of albums. Blue;S, which focuses on member Solar, peaked at number seven on the Gaon Album Chart. The lead single "Wind Flower" peaked at number nine on the Gaon Digital Chart. On February 6, 2019, the group released the Japanese version of "Wind Flower", alongside its b-side "Sleep Talk", as their second Japanese-language single. "Wind Flower" peaked at number 16 on the Oricon Singles Chart, selling 7,000 copies.

On March 14, 2019, Mamamoo released their ninth EP, and the fourth and final installment of the "Four Seasons, Four Colors" project, White Wind, on March 14, 2019, with the lead single "Gogobebe". White Wind debuted at number one on the Gaon Album Chart, selling nearly 60,000 physical copies by April 2019. "Gogobebe" also saw decent commercial success, peaking at number five on the Gaon Digital Chart and placing at number 72 on the yearly chart. The song also peaked at number two on both the Billboard Korea K-Pop Hot 100 and Billboard World Digital Songs Sales charts. On March 27, the group announced their fourth headlining concert, titled "2019 Mamamoo Concert 4Seasons F/W". The concert was held at Jangchung Gymnasium in Seoul on April 19–21. The concerts served as a grand finale for Mamamoo's "Four Seasons, Four Colors" project, launched the previous year in order to re-create the group's identity.

On July 24, Mamamoo released a new promotional single titled "Gleam" in collaboration with the brand Davich Eyeglasses. The dance and pop single saw minor success, peaking at number 89 on the Gaon Digital Chart and at number 15 on the Billboard World Digital Songs Sales chart.

In August 2019, Mamamoo was announced to be joining Mnet reality-competition show Queendom as one of six teams. The show is a "comeback battle" between six trending girl group acts in order to "determine the real number one" when all six release their singles at the same time. Queendom premiered on August 26 and ran for ten total episodes, ending on October 31. During the show's finale, the group was crowned the winner of Queendom, thus earning the prize of a full-length comeback show to be broadcast on Mnet. As part of the show, Mamamoo released various songs, including a cover of AOA's 2016 hit "Good Luck" and their original finale song "Destiny".

Following their Queendom victory, Mamamoo released their second full album, Reality in Black, on November 14, 2019, with the lead single "Hip". Reality in Black debuted and peaked atop the Gaon Album Chart, while "Hip" peaked at number four on the Digital Chart. "Hip" also debuted at number five on the World Digital Songs Sales chart and peaked atop the chart in its second week, giving the group their very first number-one hit on the chart. On February 19, 2020, Mamamoo released their third Japanese song, "Shampoo", as a digital single. The song, along with the Japanese version of "Hip", is included in the Japanese edition of Reality in Black. The Japanese edition of the album was released on March 11 and peaked at number 27 on the Oricon Albums Chart with 2,500 copies sold.

2020: Focus on members' solo activities and Travel 
In January 2020, an OSEN interview with Kim Do-hoon, the CEO and executive producer of Mamamoo's record label RBW, was published, in which Kim detailed the trajectory of Mamamoo's career and activities in 2020. He reflected on the successes of Mamamoo's participation on Queendom and their second Korean studio album Reality in Black and confirmed that the members would begin to focus on solo projects, with each member hoping to showcase their individualities that they had previously shown in the "Four Seasons, Four Colors" project series. Moon Byul became the first member to release a solo project in 2020, releasing her debut EP Dark Side of the Moon on February 14. On April 23, Solar released her debut single "Spit It Out" and its accompanying single album. Following the single's debut at number 12 (and subsequent peak at number six), Mamamoo became the second Korean group in which every member had a solo song chart on the Billboards World Digital Song Sales chart.

Mamamoo released a promotional single, "Wanna Be Myself," on September 10. The "nostalgic" and "minimalist" music video was released in conjunction with the song itself and gained 3.8 million views in its first 24 hours of being released. The single peaked at number 93 on the Gaon Digital Chart and at number 11 on the Billboard World Digital Songs Sales chart.

In October 2020, Mamamoo announced their tenth EP, due out in November. "Dingga" (딩가딩가), the first single off of the EP, was pre-released ahead of the album on October 20. The disco-influenced pop song, characterized by themes of isolation and longing in the COVID-19 pandemic, was described by Teen Vogue as a "fun, chill" dance track accompanied by a "striking, retro-inspired music video to match." Led by a "simply melody line and funky vibes," the single earned top ten positions in South Korea and on the Billboard World Digital Songs Sales chart, and further charted in Singapore and Japan. The full EP, titled Travel, and its second single, "Aya", were released on November 3. Travel received mixed receptions for its lack of cohesion, and it peaked at number two on the Gaon Album Chart. The EP broke the group's personal sales records, selling a reported 100,000 copies in its first day and over 128,000 copies in its first week, and additionally topped iTunes charts in 29 countries. Described as a "180-degree flip" from the retro-pop style of "Dingga," the second single from Travel, "Aya," was described by critics as being "alluring" and "captivating" and peaked within the top 40 of the Gaon Digital Chart.

2021–present: Member contract renewals, WAW, Mamamoo+ unit, Mic On
On January 22, 2021, RBW announced that Solar and Moon Byul had renewed their contracts with their agency, while Whee In and Hwa Sa were still currently discussing contract renewals.  On March 30, Hwa Sa officially renewed her contract with RBW, with Whee In's contract remaining under discussion. Later on the entertainment RBW also confirmed that Mamamoo will stay together and won't disband. On May 1, Mamamoo held a global virtual concert on live-streaming platform LiveNOW, becoming the first South Korean music act to hold a concert on the platform.

Their eleventh EP, WAW, was released on June 2, along with the lead single "Where Are We Now." WAW topped iTunes albums charts in 21 countries worldwide, and it sold over 40,000 domestic copies in its first day of release, according to the Hanteo chart.

On June 11, RBW announced that Whee In would be leaving the company as she has chosen not to renew her solo contract with the agency. However, she signed a second contract extension to remain as a member of Mamamoo until at least December 2023. Thus, RBW remains responsible for her activities in the group but is no longer involved in her solo endeavors. On August 31, it was revealed that Whee In signed an exclusive solo contract with the agency THEL1VE.

A compilation album, titled I Say Mamamoo: The Best, was released alongside the lead single "Mumumumuch" on September 15. The album peaked at number eight on the Gaon Album Chart. On March 23, 2022, Mamamoo released the Japanese edition of The Best.

In August 2022, it was announced that members Solar and Moon Byul would be forming the group's first official subunit, Mamamoo+, with an expected album release at the end of the month. The duo's debut single "Better" featuring rapper Big Naughty, was released as planned on August 30. 

The group released their 12th EP titled Mic On and the lead single "Illella" on October 11, 2022.

 Members 
Adapted from their RBW website profile:

 Solar (솔라)
 Moon Byul (문별)
 Whee In (휘인)
 Hwa Sa (화사)

Discography Korean albums Melting (2016)
 Reality in Black (2019)Japanese album'''
 4colors'' (2019)

Concerts

Filmography

Reality shows

Television series

Awards and nominations

Since their 2014 debut, Mamamoo has received five Mnet Asian Music Awards and Asia Artist Awards respectively, four Golden Disc Awards, Seoul Music Awards and The Fact Music Awards respectively. A total of 44 awards out of 161 nominations.

See also
 List of best-selling girl groups

References

External links
  
  

 
2014 establishments in South Korea
Musical groups established in 2014
K-pop music groups
South Korean girl groups
Musical groups from Seoul
South Korean dance music groups
Vocal quartets
Melon Music Award winners
Victor Entertainment artists